The Territorial Defense Command, known as the Army Reserve Command from 2001–2009 and the Territorial Defence Department before that, is a department of the Royal Thai Army. It is responsible for the management of the country's reserve affairs, including the training of Territorial Defence Students.

Its headquarters is located on the corner of Sanam Chai and Charoen Krung roads. Its main building, a two-storey neoclassical structure, was built in 1922, and is listed as a registered ancient monument.

References

Royal Thai Army